Ahangar Kola (also Romanized as Āhangar Kolā) is a village in Ashrestaq Rural District, Yaneh Sar District, Behshahr County, Mazandaran Province, Iran. At the 2006 census, its population was 54, in 14 families.

References 

Populated places in Behshahr County